Chang Yu (born August 14, 1988) is a retired Chinese tennis player. On 8 April 2013, he reached his highest ATP singles ranking of 335. His highest doubles ranking of 369 was achieved on 4 March 2013. He competed in two ATP World Tour events in 2012 in the doubles competition partnering Li Zhe.

ATP Challengers and ITF Futures titles

Singles: 2

Doubles: 5

References

External links

Chinese male tennis players
Living people
1988 births
Tennis players from Tianjin